St Mary the Virgin's Church, Denby is a Grade I listed parish church in the Church of England in Denby, Derbyshire.

History

The church dates from the 13th century. It comprises a tower at the west end with a recessed broached spire, a clerestoried nave with south aisle and two storey north aisle, a chancel and a south porch. Alterations were made in 1838 and it was restored between 1901 and 1903 by John Oldrid Scott. During the restoration part of the scaffolding collapsed in 1903 and one of the workmen, Job Seal of Horsley, was injured.

Parish status
The church is in a joint parish with 
St Clement's Church, Horsley
Village Hall, Kilburn

Stained glass
East window, Warrington and Co c. 1889
North aisle. Christopher Webb, 1961

Organ

The pipe organ dates from 1914 and was built by Harrison and Harrison. A specification of the organ can be found on the National Pipe Organ Register.

See also
Grade I listed churches in Derbyshire
Grade I listed buildings in Derbyshire
Listed buildings in Denby

References

Church of England church buildings in Derbyshire
Grade I listed churches in Derbyshire